Aijaz Aslam (born 3 October 1972), is a Pakistani television actor, model, producer, fashion designer and entrepreneur.

Born to a father who acted in some television plays, Aijaz began his career as a model in 1989. 

He is best known for playing the lead in his drama debut Kashkol, which was telecasted on NTM in 1993 and also in PTV's 2003 drama Mehndi and Geo TV's 2011 sitcom Kis Din Mera Viyah Howay Ga.

Career

Fashion design and modelling
Aijaz Aslam is also a dress designer in the Pakistan show business industry. Before entering the media industry, Aijaz completed a fashion designing course from London. He took his first steps in to the modeling industry in 1989. Aslam also has his own clothing brand, entitled Aijazz Aslam.

Acting and production
His television debut came in 1993, for a role in Kashkol. His television serial was Kahaan se Kahaan Tak on PTV followed with Khahish-e-Benaam and Mehndi. His comedy drama Main aur Tum on ARY Digital was popular and considered one of the best comedy shows ever. He became producer with production house ICE Media and Entertainment in 2015.

Business
In 2020, he established his second business venture, a personal care line, in collaboration with the renowned skincare brand Hemani. Earlier, he had launched a clothing brand.

Filmography

Films

Television

Telefilms

Anthology series

Other appearances

As a producer
 Ahsas
 Tere Bina
 Dil Nawaz
 Makin
 Khalish
 Qismat Ka Likha
 Gustakh

References

External links 
 
 
 Aijaz Aslam's official website

Pakistani male television actors
Pakistani male models
Living people
1972 births
Male actors from Lahore
Businesspeople from Karachi
Pakistani fashion designers
Male actors in Urdu cinema